Jairam Kulkarni was an Indian Marathi-language film actor who worked in several Marathi films, television, and theatre. He is better known for Ashi Hi Banwa Banwi (1988), Maza Pati Karodpati (1988), and Aamchya Sarkhe Aamhich (1990). He was born on 17 October 1932 and died  on 17 March 2020.

Filmography

Films 

 Navri Mile Navaryala (1984) - Nanasaheb Inamdar
 Dhum Dhadaka (1985) - Mahesh's father
 Maaficha Sakshidar (1986)
 Gammat Jammat (1987) - Bar Owner
 De Danadan (1987) - DSP Dhoipode
 Chal Re Lakshaya Mumbaila (1987)
 Khare Kadhi Bolu Naye (1987)
 Khatyal Sasu Nathal Sun (1988)
 Rangat Sangat (1988)
 Maza Pati Karodpati (1988) - Deshmukh
 Ashi Hi Banwa Banwi (1988) - Chhabu Rao
Ek Gadi Baaki Anadi (1988)
 Bhutacha Bhau (1989)
 Balache Baap Brahmachari (1989) - Bapusaheb Aasankar
 Eka Peksha Ek (1990) - Mumbai Police Commissioner
 Aamchya Sarkhe Aamhich (1990) - Diwanji
 Aayatya Gharat Gharoba (1991) - Sakharam
 Maherchi Sadi (1991)
 Zunj Tujhi Majhi (1992)
 Khel Aayushyacha (2020)

Death 

Kulkarni died on 17 March 2020 in Pune, Maharashtra due to heart failure. He was survived by his wife Hema Kulkarni, sons Rupak and Ruchir Kulkarni, and daughter-in-law Mrinal Kulkarni. Many celebrities like Ashok Saraf and Sachin Pilgaonkar mourned this great loss.

See also
Marathi cinema

References 

1932 births
2020 deaths
Marathi actors
People from Solapur district